Yuzuru Hanyu, a Japanese figure skater and ice show producer, has performed to thirteen different short programs and free skate programs each in the course of his competitive career. The background and making of his Olympic programs was broadly covered by the media, especially Japanese newspapers, magazines, and television broadcasts. Outside competition, Hanyu skated multiple programs at exhibition galas and ice shows, some of them being performed as live music collaborations with renowned guest artists like singer Toshi or the J-pop duo Chemistry. He also dedicated various gala performances to the victims of the 2011 Tōhoku earthquake and tsunami and participated in all editions of the annual charity show  on Nippon TV since 2014.

In January 2020, a selection of Hanyu's programs was performed as a special concert named Music with Wings at the Tokyo International Forum, featuring an orchestra of one hundred musicians as well as violinist Ikuko Kawai and pianist Kotaro Fukuma among other guest artists. A selection of programs was also published as two home videos named Time of Awakening and Time of Evolution, summarizing his competitive career until the 2017–18 figure skating season.

Hanyu has published three autobiographies with the titles  as well as various compilations and photobooks in collaboration with Japanese photographer Sunao Noto. In 2021, a summary of Hanyu's graduation thesis "A feasibility study on utilization in figure skating by a wireless inertia sensor motion capture system" was published in the Waseda Journal of Human Sciences by Waseda University.

Figure skating programs

Competition and exhibition programs

Show programs as a competitive skater

Show programs as a professional skater

Programs performed exclusively on Hanyu's YouTube channel

Music with Wings program concert

Home media

Yuzuru Hanyu "Time of Awakening"

Yuzuru Hanyu "Time of Evolution"

Bibliography

Autobiographies and own works

 167 p.
 282 p.
 304 p.

 64 p.

Compilations

 167 p.
 232 p.
 127 p.
 264 p.
 192 p.
 320 p.

Photobooks

 128 p.
 144 p.
 256 p.
 192 p.
 160 p.

References

Citations

Books and magazines cited

External links

Yuzuru Hanyu at ISBNdb.com
 (in Japanese)

Yuzuru Hanyu
Fantasy on Ice
Figure skating-related lists
Lists of concerts and performances
Videographies of Japanese artists
Bibliographies by writer